Endocomia is a genus of flowering trees in the family Myristicaceae with a distribution ranging from Indochina to New Guinea. It is distinguished from the other Asian genera by its monoecious inflorescences which are unique in the mostly dioecious Myristicaceae. The only other place where monoecy is reported in the family is in a few Iryanthera species in South America.

Species 
According to Kew's Plants of the World Online, there are four accepted species:

 Endocomia canarioides (King) de Wilde
 Endocomia macrocoma (Miq.) de Wilde
 Endocomia rufirachis (Sinclair) de Wilde
 Endocomia virella de Wilde

References 

Myristicaceae genera
Myristicaceae